Lardner may refer to:
 Dionysius Lardner (1793–1859), Irish scientific writer
 Demi Lardner, Australian comedian
 James Carrige Rushe Lardner (1879–1925), Irish Nationalist Member of the UK Parliament
 James L. Lardner (1802–1881), American Civil War admiral
 John Lardner (born 1973), Scottish snooker player
 John Lardner (sports writer) (1912–1960), American sports journalist
 Kym Lardner (born 1957), Australian children's author, illustrator, and storyteller
 Larry Lardner, Brigade Commandant for the Irish Republican Army
 Nathanial Lardner (1684–1768), English theologian
 Rebecca Lardner (born 1971), English artist
 Ring Lardner (1885–1933), American writer
 Ring Lardner Jr. (1915–2000), American film screenwriter